Fairtrade Town is a status awarded by a recognized Fairtrade certification body (i.e. The Fairtrade Foundation in the UK, TransFair Canada in Canada etc.) describing an area which is committed to the promotion of Fairtrade certified goods. By extension, the organizations also award the statuses of Fairtrade Nation, Fairtrade City, Fairtrade Village, Fairtrade Zone, Fairtrade Borough, Fairtrade Island, Fairtrade County and Fairtrade University.

Australia

Communities
Yarra

Austria

Towns

Altaussee
Bad Aussee
Baden bei Wien
Bad Mitterndorf
Breitenfurt bei Wien
Feldbach, Austria
Fürstenfeld
Gablitz
Gleisdorf
Grundlsee
Lieboch
Liezen
Lichtenegg
Mönichkirchen
Mürzzuschlag
Ottendorf an der Rittschein
Payerbach
Pichl-Kainisch
Poysdorf
Rainbach im Mühlkreis
Retz
Sankt Valentin
Scheibbs
Tauplitz
Ulrichskirchen-Schleinbach
Waidhofen an der Ybbs
Warth, Lower Austria
Weiz
Wiener Neustadt
Molln
Losenstein
Hartkirchen
Steinbach an der Steyr
St. Leonhard am Forst

Boroughs

Wieden
Josefstadt

Belgium

Towns

Ghent
Voeren
Zwijndrecht
Hoogstraten
Kortrijk
Lichtervelde
Herent
Heusden-Zolder
Leuven
Herk-de-Stad
Hasselt
Genk
Eeklo
Beveren
Malle
Brussels
Wijnegem
Westerlo
Roeselare
Turnhout
Schelle
Schoten
Deerlijk
Geel
Koksijde
Antwerp
Hoegaarden
Hamont-Achel
Zoersel
Boutersem
Oostkamp
Mechelen
Tielt
Beerse
Ypres
Maldegem
Ostend
Bornem
Kalmthout
Essen
Wuustwezel
Izegem
Lommel
Kuurne
Oosterzele
Bierbeek
Sint-Truiden
Bruges
Duffel
Middelkerke
Rotselaar
Vilvoorde
Balen
Holsbeek
Herentals
Brecht
Elsene
Vorselaar
Nijlen
Overpelt
Sint-Niklaas
Aalst
Alken
Kasterlee
Haacht
Edegem
Mol
Poperinge
Wetteren
De Pinte
Damme
Waregem
Asse
Scherpenheuvel-Zichem
Evergem
Laakdal
Harelbeke
Dilbeek
Tessenderlo
Anzegem
Grimbergen
Arendonk
Houthalen-Helchteren
Riemst
Merelbeke
Diest
Puurs
Knokke-Heist
Stabroek
Bocholt
Nieuwpoort
Rumst
Rijkevorsel
Beernem
Oud-Heverlee
Vosselaar
Assenede
As
Lier
Lokeren
Hooglede
Hoeilaart
Lummen
Bilzen
Kontich
Mortsel
Ham
Tongeren
Oud-Turnhout
Sint-Gillis-Waas
Zottegem
Halle
Beringen
Tervuren
Gooik
Herne

Towns
Brussels
Ixelles
Mons
Fernelmont
Florennes

Brazil

Towns
Alfenas

Canada

Towns

Wolfville
La Pêche
Port Colborne
Nakusp
Golden
Gimli
Olds
Revelstoke
Neuville
Mercier-Hochelaga-Maisonneuve
Vancouver
Barrie
Sainte Anne de Bellevue
Canmore
Sherbrooke
Toronto
Edmonton

Czech Republic

Cities

Český Krumlov
Chrudim
Hodonín
Kroměříž
Litoměřice
Mladá Boleslav
Třebíč
Volyně
Vsetín

Denmark

Cities
Copenhagen

France

Territories

 Conseil Régional des Pays de la Loire
 Conseil Régional Nord-Pas-de-Calais
 Ville d'Alfortville (Val de Marne)
 Ville de Boulogne-Billancourt (Hauts-de-Seine)
 Ville de Cluses (Haute-Savoie)
 Ville de Drancy (Seine-St-Denis)
 Ville de Longjumeau (Essonne)
 Ville de Dijon (Côtes d'Or)
 Ville de Lyon (Rhône)
 Ville de Mouans-Sartoux (Alpes-Maritimes)
 Ville de Nantes (Loire-Atlantique)
 Ville de Paris (Paris)
 Ville de Saint-Paul (Ile de la Réunion)
 Ville de Tours (Indre et Loire)
 Conseil Régional d'Ile-de-France
 Conseil Régional Rhône-Alpes
 Ville de Bourg-en-Bresse (Ain)
 Ville de Chevilly-Larue (Val-de-Marne)
 Ville de Grenoble (Isère)
 Ville d'Orléans (Loiret)
 Ville de Rodez(Aveyron)
 Ville de Saales (Bas-Rhin)
 Ville d'Ungersheim (Haut-Rhin)

Finland

Cities

Tampere
Pori
Espoo
Joensuu
Lohja
Riihimäki

Municipalities
Utajärvi
Kirkkonummi

Germany

Towns

Ludwigsburg
Saarbrücken
Neuss
Dortmund
Marburg
Rumbach
Neumarkt in der Oberpfalz
Castrop-Rauxel
Dinslaken
Sonthofen
Bad Honnef
Wesel
Rottenburg am Neckar
Hannover
Viernheim
Abensberg
Trier
Nordhausen
Wolfsburg
Herrsching am Ammersee
Heidelberg
Augsburg
Nürnberg
Karlsruhe
Rheda-Wiedenbrück
Wuppertal
Rhein-Kreis Neuss
Jena

Ireland

Towns

Athlone
Ballymun
Baltinglass
Bandon
Bantry
Bray
Carlow
Castlebar
Clonakilty
Cork City
Dublin City
Ennis
Galway
Greystones
Kilkenny
Kinsale
Limerick
Maynooth
Mullingar
Newbridge
Portlaoise
Roscommon
Skibbereen
Sligo
Thurles
Tubbercurry
Waterford
Westport
Wexford

Italy

Communes

Anzola dell'Emilia
Appignano del Tronto
Concorezzo
Finale Ligure
Florence
Foligno
Follonica
Genazzano
Mezzago
Modena
Padua
Pozzallo
Rome
Sala Bolognese
Settimo Torinese
Valdagno

Provinces

Cremona
Ferrara
Milan
Liguria

Netherlands

Towns 

Goes
Groningen

Het Bildt

Norway

Communes 

Sauda
Lier
Asker
Stavanger
Fredrikstad
Kvinesdal
Volda
Ørsta
Bergen
Flora

Spain

Cities
Córdoba
Espejo
Torrelavega
Puerto Real
Laredo
Madrid
Getxo
Bilbao
Orihuela
Málaga
Legazpi

Sweden

Cities

Alingsås Municipality
Askersund Municipality
Avesta Municipality
Borlänge Municipality
Borås Municipality
Botkyrka Municipality
Boxholm Municipality
Eda Municipality
Emmaboda Municipality
Eskilstuna Municipality
Fagersta Municipality
Forshaga Municipality
Gnosjö Municipality
Gotland Municipality
Göteborg Municipality
Hallsberg Municipality
Hammarö Municipality
Haparanda Municipality
Helsingborg Municipality
Härnösand Municipality 
Härryda Municipality
Jönköping Municipality
Kalmar Municipality
Karlstad Municipality
Kil Municipality
Kristinehamn Municipality
Kumla Municipality
Landskrona Municipality
Lerum Municipality
Linköping Municipality
Ljungby Municipality
Lomma Municipality
Ludvika Municipality
Luleå Municipality
Lund Municipality
Malmö Municipality
Mark Municipality
Munkfors Municipality
Norrköping Municipality
Nässjö Municipality
Piteå Municipality
Ronneby Municipality
Sigtuna Municipality
Strömstad Municipality
Sundbyberg Municipality
Säffle Municipality
Söderköping Municipality
Södertälje Municipality
Tranås Municipality
Trollhättan Municipality
Töreboda Municipality
Uddevalla Municipality
Umeå Municipality
Vänersborg Municipality
Västerås Municipality
Växjö Municipality
Ängelholm Municipality
Öckerö Municipality
Örebro Municipality
Östersund Municipality

United Kingdom

Nations

Wales
Scotland

Cities

Aberdeen
Belfast
Birmingham
Brighton & Hove
Bristol
Cambridge
Cardiff
Carlisle
Chelmsford
Chester
Chichester
Conwy
Coventry
Derby
Dundee
Edinburgh
Exeter
Flintshire
Glasgow
Hereford
Inverness
Hull
Lancaster
Leeds
Leicester
Liverpool
London (City of London) 
Manchester
Newcastle upon Tyne
Norwich
Nottingham
Oxford
Perth
Plymouth
Portsmouth
Preston
Salford
Sheffield
Southampton
St Albans
Stirling
Stoke-on-Trent
Swansea
Wells
Wolverhampton
Worcester
York

Towns

Aberfeldy
Abergele
Aberystwyth
Alsager
Altrincham
Ammanford
Andover
Arundel
Ashbourne
Axbridge
Baildon
Bewdley
Bideford
Bingley
Bolton
Bradford on Avon
Brampton
Brecon
Bridgnorth
Burgess Hill
Burntisland
Calne
Cam & Dursley
Castle Cary
Chesham
Church Stretton
Colchester
Cowbridge
Devizes
Doncaster
Dorchester
Dorking
Dornoch
Dunoon
East Grinstead
East Kilbride
Edenbridge
Ellon
Falkirk
Falmouth
Faringdon
Faversham
Frome
Garstang
Grange-over-Sands
Glastonbury
Guildford
Guisborough
Hamilton
Hartlepool
Hitchin
Holme Valley
Horsham
Hornsea
Horwich
Ilkley
Ipswich
Kendal
Kenilworth
Keswick
Keynsham
Knighton
Lampeter
Largs
Ledbury
Leighton–Linslade
Leominster
Lewes
Linlithgow
Livingston
Llanidloes
Lochgelly
Lowestoft
Ludlow
Malvern
Matlock & District
Millom
Minehead
Mirfield
Monmouth
Morpeth
Motherwell
Nailsworth
Newbury
New Mills
Northallerton
Northampton
Oban & District
Oswestry
Paisley
Penarth
Reading
Penarth
Penistone
Porthcawl
Reading
Romsey
Rotherham
Royal Leamington Spa
Sandbach
Sevenoaks
Shipley, West Yorkshire
Sleaford, Lincolnshire
Southwell
St Andrews
St Neots
Stafford
Stamford
Stourport-on-Severn
Strathaven
Stroud
Swanage
Taunton
Tavistock
Teignmouth
Thornbury, South Gloucestershire
Uckfield
Ware
Wareham
Wiveliscombe
Windermere & Bowness
Worthing
Wotton-under-Edge

Villages

Bradford-on-Avon
Cherry Burton
Criccieth
Fairlie
Haworth
Kilmacolm and Quarriers
Wheatley, Oxfordshire
Winscombe

Counties

Cardiff
Conwy
Cumbria
Denbighshire
Devon
East Riding of Yorkshire
Flintshire
Herefordshire
Kinross-shire
Somerset
Swansea

Boroughs

Charnwood
Gosport
Harrogate
London Borough of Camden
London Borough of Croydon
Royal Borough of Greenwich
London Borough of Hammersmith and Fulham
London Borough of Islington
Royal Borough of Kingston upon Thames
London Borough of Lambeth
London Borough of Lewisham
London Borough of Richmond upon Thames
Milton Keynes
Pendle
Rochdale
Stockport
Swindon
Vale Royal
Warrington
Wirral
Woking

Islands

Fair Isle
Guernsey
Jersey
Papa Westray
Shetland Islands
Westray

Zones

Bath and North East Somerset
Bradford
Chorlton-cum-Hardy
Dyfi Valley
Eden Valley
Hebden Bridge
Lakes Parish
Lingfield & Dormansland
Mid-Formartine in Aberdeenshire
Peebles & Tweeddale
Weymouth and Portland
Wrexham
Yatton & Claverham

Universities

 Aberystwyth University
 Anglia Ruskin University
 Aston University
 Bangor University
 Bishop Grosseteste University
 University of Birmingham
 Blackpool and Fylde College
 Bournemouth University
 Brunel University
 Buckinghamshire New University
 Canterbury Christ Church University
 Cardiff University
 Carmel College
 City College Plymouth
 Deeside College (FE)
 Durham University
 Edinburgh Napier University
 Farnborough Sixth Form College
 Fitzwilliam College, Cambridge
 Harper Adams University
 Heriot-Watt University
 Hertford College, Oxford
 Jesus College, Cambridge
 Keele University
 King's College London
 King's College, Cambridge
 Kingston University London
 Lancaster and Morecambe College (HE & FE)
 Lancaster University
 Leeds Metropolitan
 Leeds Trinity University
 Linacre College, Oxford
 Liverpool Hope University
 Liverpool John Moores University
 London School of Economics and Political Science
 London South Bank University
 Loughborough University
 Manchester Metropolitan University
 Myerscough College
 NEWI (North Wales Institute of Further Education)
 Newman University, Birmingham
 Northumbria University
 Nottingham Trent University
 Oxford Brookes
 Pembroke College, Cambridge
 Pendelton College (FE & HE)
 Queen's University, Belfast
 Roehampton University
 Royal Holloway College, London
 Sheffield College (FE & HE)
 Sheffield Hallam University
 South East Essex College (HE & FE)
 Southampton Solent University
 St Brendan's Sixth Form College
 St Catharine's College (Cambridge Uni)
 St John's University, York
 St. Mary's University College (Belfast)
 Sunderland (City of S. College) (FE & HE)
 Swansea Metropolitan University
 Trinity College Carmarthen University
 University College London
 University of Aberdeen
 University of Abertay Dundee
 University of Bath
 University of Birmingham
 University of Bradford
 University of Brighton
 University of Bristol
 University of Cardiff
 University of Central Lancashire
 University of Chester
 University of Chichester
 University of Derby
 University of Dundee
 University of East Anglia
 University of Edinburgh
 University of Essex
 University of Exeter
 University of Glamorgan
 University of Glasgow
 University of Gloucestershire
 University of Hertfordshire
 University of Huddersfield
 University of Hull
 University of Kent
 University of Leeds
 University of Leicester
 University of Liverpool
 University of Manchester
 University of Newcastle upon Tyne
 University of Nottingham
 University of Plymouth
 University of Portsmouth
 University of Reading
 University of Sheffield
 University of Southampton
 University of St Andrews
 University of Staffordshire
 University of Sunderland
 University of Surrey
 University of Sussex
 University of Teesside
 University of Wales, Newport
 University of Wales Institute, Cardiff
 University of Wales Swansea
 University of Warwick
 University of Winchester
 University of Wolverhampton
 University of York
 UWE, Bristol
 Wadham College, Oxford
 Westminster Kingsway College (FE & HE)
 Worcester College of Technology (FE&HE)

United States

Towns

Media, PA
Brattleboro, VT
Milwaukee, WI
Amherst, MA
Taos, NM
Northampton MA
San Francisco, CA
Montclair, NJ
Ballston Spa, NY
Chico, CA
Bluffton, OH
Burlington, VT
Highland Park, NJ
Buena Vista, CO
Red Bank, NJ
Madison, WI
Norman, OK
Conway, MA
Boston, MA
Berkeley, CA
Teaneck, NJ
Chicago, IL
Greenwich, CT
Healdsburg, CA
Mankato, MN
Princeton, NJ
Claremont, CA
Winter Park, FL
Chapel Hill, NC
La Mesa, CA
Fond du Lac, WI
Pasadena, CA
Bloomington, IN
Dayton, OH
Alexandria, VA
San Ramon, CA
Chelsea, MI
Lawrence, KS
Cleveland Heights, OH
Overland Park, KS
State College, PA
Olympia, WA

Universities and colleges

University of Wisconsin, Oshkosh
University of California, San Diego
Siena College (NY)
Western Kentucky University
Manhattan College
Saint Michael's College (VT)
Loras College (IA)
Penn State, Brandywine
Creighton University (NE)
University of San Diego
Pomona College (CA)
Assumption College
Rollins College (FL)
Villanova University (PA)
DePaul University (IL)
Cabrini College (PA)
Champlain College (VT)
Colby Sawyer College (NH)
Loyola Marymount University (CA)
Saint Joseph's University (PA)
Saint Mary’s College of California
Berea College (KY)
Tulane University (LA)
Neuman University (PA)
Hartwick College (NY)
Seattle University (WA)
John Carroll University (OH)
St. Mary's University (TX)
Moraine Park Technical College (WI)

Schools

Emma Willard School (NY)
Penncrest High School (PA)
Loyola Catholic School (MN)
Magnificat High School (PA)
The Walden School (PA)
Teaneck High School (NJ)
Media Elementary School (PA)
The Community School (ID)
Phillips Exeter High School (NH)
Media Providence Friends School (PA)
Mercy Vocational High School (PA)
Chaminade Julienne (OH)
Cardinal Newman High School (CA)
St. Mary's College High School (CA)

Congregations

Our Lady of Assumption (Claremont, CA)
2nd Congressional/1st Presbyterian Church (Rockford, IL)
St. John's Episcopal Church (Mankato, MN)
Congregation Beth Shalom (Teaneck, NJ)
Holy Family Church (South Pasadena, CA)
First Congregational U.C.C. (Mankato, MN)
First Church of the Nazarene (San Diego, CA)
St. Paul's Lutheran Church (Teaneck, NJ)
St. Timothy Catholic Church (West Los Angeles, CA)
St. Martin of Tours Catholic Church (La Mesa, CA)
The Unity Center (San Diego, CA)

References

External links

TransFair Canada – information on the campaign in Canada
Max Havelaar Belgium – information on the campaign in Belgium
Fairtradová města - information on the campaign in the Czech republic
TransFair e.V. – information on the campaign in Germany
Fairtrade Ireland – information on the campaign in Ireland
TransFair Italia – information on the campaign in Italy
Fairtrade Gemeente – information on the campaign in the Netherlands
Fairtrade Max Havelaar Norge – information on the campaign in Norway
Rättvisemärkt – information on the campaign in Sweden
Fairtrade Foundation – information on the campaign in the UK
FAIRTRADE Austria – information on the campaign in Austria

Fair trade
Fairtrade